Anat Fort (born March 8, 1970, near Tel Aviv) is an Israeli jazz pianist and composer who has recorded several acclaimed albums and performed across Europe and the United States.

Fort studied music at William Paterson University in New Jersey and moved to New York in 1996 to develop her skills in jazz improvisation under the guidance of pianist Paul Bley and study composition with Harold Seletsky before releasing her debut self-produced album Peel in 1999. Her first album for ECM Records, A Long Story (2007) arose from an association with drummer Paul Motian. This was followed by the first album by her regular working group - the Anat Fort Trio, And If, in 2010.

Discography
Peel (Orchard, 1999)
A Long Story (ECM, 2007)
And If (ECM, 2010)
Birdwatching (ECM, 2016), with Anat Fort Trio featuring Gianluigi Trovesi
Bubbles (Hypnote Records, 2019), with Lieven Venken & Rene Hart
Colour (Sunnyside Records, 2019), with Anat Fort Trio

References

External links
www.anatfort.com

1970 births
Living people
Avant-garde jazz pianists
Free jazz pianists
Israeli jazz pianists
Mainstream jazz pianists
Post-bop pianists
Musicians from Tel Aviv
21st-century pianists